Wyoming is a city in Hamilton County, Ohio; It is located approximately 12 miles north of downtown Cincinnati and is part of the Cincinnati metropolitan area. The population was 8,756 at the 2020 census.

History
Among the earliest European-American settlers in what is now Wyoming was the Pendery family, who arrived in 1805. Wyoming was named after Wyoming County, Pennsylvania, where some settlers had come from.

Geography
Wyoming is located at  (39.228609, −84.474391).

Demographics

2010 census
As of the census of 2010, there were 8,428 people, 3,105 households, and 2,385 families living in the city. The racial makeup of the city was 83.6% White, 11.3% African American, 0.1% Native American, 2.1% Asian, 0.5% from other races, and 2.2% from two or more races. Hispanic or Latino of any race were 1.8% of the population.

There were 3,105 households, of which 42.1% had children under the age of 18 living with them, 63.2% were married couples living together, 10.7% had a female householder with no husband present, 2.9% had a male householder with no wife present, and 23.2% were non-families. 21.2% of all households were made up of individuals, and 9.5% had someone living alone who was 65 years of age or older. The average household size was 2.68 and the average family size was 3.13.

The median age in the city was 42.4 years. 29.7% of residents were under the age of 18; 4.7% were between the ages of 18 and 24; 19.8% were from 25 to 44; 31.6% were from 45 to 64; and 14.2% were 65 years of age or older. The gender makeup of the city was 47.5% male and 52.5% female.

2000 census
As of the census of 2000, there were 8,261 people, 3,047 households, and 2,404 families living in the city. The population density was 2,865.9 people per square mile (1,107.5/km2). There were 3,172 housing units at an average density of 1,100.4 per square mile (425.2/km2). The racial makeup of the city was 87.53% White, 9.54% African American, 0.13% Native American, 1.36% Asian, 0.39% from other races, and 1.05% from two or more races. Hispanic or Latino of any race were 1.28% of the population.

There were 3,047 households, out of which 42.3% had children under the age of 18 living with them, 67.3% were married couples living together, 9.7% had a female householder with no husband present, and 21.1% were non-families. 19.3% of all households were made up of individuals, and 8.4% had someone living alone who was 65 years of age or older. The average household size was 2.70 and the average family size was 3.11.

In the city, the population is age-diverse with 30.6% under the age of 18, 4.0% from 18 to 24, 25.0% from 25 to 44, 26.2% from 45 to 64, and 14.2% who were 65 years of age or older. The median age was 40 years. For every 100 females, there were 90.1 males. For every 100 females age 18 and over, there were 85.2 males.

The median income for a household in the city was $88,241, and the median income for a family was $103,089. Males had a median income of $71,851 versus $40,601 for females. The per capita income for the city was $38,180. About 0.7% of families and 1.4% of the population were below the poverty line, including 0.6% of those under age 18 and 2.0% of those age 65 or over.

Education
Wyoming has a renowned education system: the Wyoming City School District. The district was ranked first in the state of Ohio on the 2004–2005 State Report Card, with an index score of 108.2. Most recently the district was ranked 3rd in the state of Ohio on the 2022 report card. There are three elementary schools (Vermont, Hilltop, and Elm), one middle school, and one high school, Wyoming High School.

Wyoming is served by a branch of the Public Library of Cincinnati and Hamilton County.

Culture 
The cultural focus in Wyoming is largely based around community support, including high school and community-gathering events. The city offers many opportunities and is home to people of all ages, including vibrant young adults and young families. Community involvement and school pride are important in Wyoming and a major reason why the Wyoming City School district is rated among the top districts in Ohio.

Notable people
Tom Agna, award-winning comedy writer and actor
Jacob Ammen, United States Army general
Alyssa Beckerman, gymnast
Jacob H. Bromwell, congressman from Ohio and mayor of Wyoming
Deena Deardurff, Olympic swimmer
George Benson Fox, United States Army officer, American businessman, political figure
John R. Fox, Medal of Honor recipient
William Greider, journalist
Paul Hackett, politician
Judson Harmon, politician, U.S. Attorney General, 45th Governor of Ohio
Angelo Herndon, Communist organizer
Livingston W. Houston, president of Rensselaer Polytechnic Institute
Peter G. Levine, stroke researcher and educator
Robert McGinnis, artist
C.F. Payne, illustrator
David Payne, Olympic silver medalist hurdler
John Weld Peck, federal judge
John E. Pepper, Jr, American businessman
Ahmed Plummer, cornerback for the San Francisco 49ers
Robert Reily, founder of Wyoming and United States Army officer
Jeff Russell, Major League Baseball pitcher
David Shenk, author
Tracy Smith, CBS News journalist
Otto Warmbier, college student and who was tortured  in North Korea

See also
 National Register of Historic Places listings in Hamilton County, Ohio
 Village Historic District
 Wyoming Pastry Shop

References

External links

 City of Wyoming official website

 
Cities in Hamilton County, Ohio
Populated places established in 1861
Cities in Ohio
1861 establishments in Ohio